F. Douglas Bolstorff (October 29, 1931 – December 3, 2021) was an American basketball player and coach.

He played collegiately for the University of Minnesota.

He was selected by the Detroit Pistons in the 8th round (57th pick overall) of the 1957 NBA Draft.

He played for the Pistons (1957–58) in the NBA for three games.

F. Doug Bolstorff also served as coach of Macalester College until his retirement in 2001.

Bolstroff died at his home on December 3, 2021, at age 91.

External links

References 

 https://athletics.macalester.edu/news/2021/12/6/general-longtime-macalester-coach-doug-bolstorff-passes-away.aspx Macalester Athletics, 2021-12-6. Retrieved on November 24, 2022
 https://www.startribune.com/obituaries/detail/0000410260/ StarTribune 2021-12-8. Retrieved on November 24, 2022

1931 births
2021 deaths
American men's basketball players
Basketball players from Minnesota
Detroit Pistons draft picks
Detroit Pistons players
Minnesota Golden Gophers men's basketball players
Guards (basketball)